Krishnarajpete (also spelled Krishnaraja Pete, and often abbreviated to K R Pete or KR Pete) is one of the seats in Karnataka Legislative Assembly in India. It is part of Mandya Lok Sabha seat.

Members of Legislative Assembly

Krishnarajpet (Mysore State)
 1951: S. M. Lingappa, Indian National Congress
 1957: M. K. Bomme Gowda, Indian National Congress
 1962: N. Nanje Gowda, Independent
 1967: M. K. Bommegowda, Independent
 1972: S. M. Lingappa, Indian National Congress

Krishnarajpet (Karnataka State)
 1978: S. M. Lingappa, Janata Party
 1983: M. Puttaswamygowda, Indian National Congress
 1985: Krishna, Janata Party
 1989: M. Puttaswamygowda, Indian National Congress
 1994: Krishna, Janata Dal  (Elected to Lok Sabha in 1996) 
 1996 (By-poll): B. Prakash, Independent
 1999: K.B. Chandrashekar, Indian National Congress
 2004: Krishna, Janata Dal (Secular)
 2008: K.B. Chandrashekar, Indian National Congress
 2013: Narayana Gowda, Janata Dal (Secular)
 2018: Narayana Gowda, Janata Dal (Secular). Resigned in 2019, and was re-elected as BJP member.
 2019 (By-poll): Narayana Gowda, Bharatiya Janata Party

Election results

2018 Assembly Election
 Narayanagowda (JD-S) : 88,016 votes  
 K B Chandrashekar (INC) : 70897 votes

2019 bypoll
 Narayana Gowda (BJP) : 66094
 B. L. Devaraj	(JD-S) : 56363

1972 Assembly Election
 S. M. Lingappa (INC) : 29,424 votes   	
 M. K. Bommognoa (IND) : 15410

1967 Assembly Election
 M. K. Bommegowda (IND) : 28512 votes    
 S. M. Lingappa (INC) : 11048

See also 
 List of constituencies of Karnataka Legislative Assembly

References 

Assembly constituencies of Karnataka